Dennis Aogo (born 14 January 1987) is a German former professional footballer who played as a left back and midfielder.

Early life
Born to a German mother and a Nigerian father, Aogo grew up in Oberreut, a suburb in the south-west of Karlsruhe, Baden-Württemberg. In 2000, when his parents split up, he moved with his father to Bruchsal and left Karlsruher SC to join Waldhof Mannheim. In 2002, aged 15, he joined SC Freiburg and attended their youth academy while graduating with Mittlere Reife at Max-Weber-Schule in Freiburg.

Club career

Aogo played with the Karlsruher SC academy and has played at several youth levels including the U15s and U16s. Since 2004, he was a part of the SC Freiburg academy, and celebrated his debut in the Bundesliga at seventeen years of age and he immediately won himself a place in the centre of midfield.

Aogo joined signed at Bundesliga club Hamburger SV in 2008 and was part of the regular starting lineup, mostly as a left back. On 29 August 2013, Aogo was loaned to Schalke 04. S04 then agreed transfer fee terms in June 2014 for a permanent €2,000,000 move, and Aogo signed a contract with Schalke 04 running until 30 June 2017.

On 9 August 2017, Aogo moved to VfB Stuttgart.

On 3 September 2019, Hannover 96 announced the signing of Aogo on a free transfer. In January 2020, he agreed the termination of his contract with the club.

Aogo announced his retirement from playing in August 2020. He amassed 340 appearances in the two top divisions of German pro football.

International career

Aogo was a member of the German U21 squad. Due to FIFA regulations at the time he was prevented from representing the Nigeria national team having earlier represented Germany at youth and at age group levels. But in 2004, FIFA removed the age limit for switching of nationalities, meaning that Aogo could have represented Nigeria. However, after turning down several invitations by the Nigerian Football Association he declared his desire to continue representing Germany as he saw a good chance to earn a place in the German senior squad in the future.

Nigeria, the homeland of Aogo's father, wanted to call him up for the 2010 FIFA World Cup in South Africa as Shaibu Amodu watched him for a considerable time but Aogo announced on 5 January 2010 that he would only play for the Germany national team. He made his debut for Germany in their first preparation game against Malta in a 3–0 victory on 13 May 2010, playing 79 minutes, before being replaced by fellow full-back and then Hamburg club mate Jérôme Boateng. Aogo was included in Germany's 2010 FIFA World Cup squad. He won his last cap in early June 2013.

Style of play
Germany national youth football team coach Horst Hrubesch said about Aogo that he has "a very good left foot, is clever with or without the ball at his feet, tactically flexible on the football pitch, and can cross and pass through good diagonal balls to forwards".

Personal life
Aogo was previously engaged to Alessia Walch; the bass player for German Country-Pop band Mayor's Destiny.

Aogo received the Silbernes Lorbeerblatt; the highest sports award in Germany.

Career statistics

Club

International

Honours
Germany U21
UEFA European Under-21 Championship: 2009

Germany
FIFA World Cup third place: 2010

Individual
Silbernes Lorbeerblatt: 2010

References

External links

 

Living people
1987 births
Footballers from Karlsruhe
Association football defenders
Association football midfielders
German footballers
Germany youth international footballers
Germany under-21 international footballers
Germany international footballers
Karlsruher SC players
SC Freiburg players
Hamburger SV players
FC Schalke 04 players
VfB Stuttgart players
Hannover 96 players
German sportspeople of Nigerian descent
Bundesliga players
2. Bundesliga players
2010 FIFA World Cup players
21st-century German people